The Church of the Visitation is in Ein Karem, Jerusalem.

Church of the Visitation, dedicated to the Visitation (in German Mariä Heimsuchung), may also refer to (alphabetically by location):
 Basilica of the Visitation, Għarb
 Visitation of the Blessed Virgin Mary Church (Bronx, New York)
 Church of the Visitation of the Blessed Virgin Mary, Kraków
 Visitation of Mary Church (Ljubljana)
 Mariä Heimsuchung, Munich
 Church of the Visitation of the Virgin Mary, Nitra
 Church of the Visitation in the Rue St. Antoine, Paris, now the Temple du Marais
 Church of the Visitation of the Virgin Mary, Povazska Bystrica
 Church of the Visitation of the Blessed Virgin Mary (O'Connor, Nebraska)
 Church of the Visitation of the Blessed Virgin Mary, Warsaw
 Church of the Visitation of the Blessed Virgin Mary, Voćin
 Church of the Visitation (Westphalia, Texas)
 Mariä Heimsuchung, Wiesbaden